Hjerkinn Station  is a railway station located at Hjerkinn in Dovre, Norway. The station is located on the Dovre Line and served by four daily express trains each direction to Oslo and Trondheim. There is no settlement at Hjerkinn, though there is an army base as well as the nearby Dovre National Park.

The station was opened in 1921 as part of the Dovre Line when it was extended from Dombås to Trondheim. The building has been preserved as a cultural heritage site, but the buildings have been worn down due to the weather. The highest point of the Dovre Line, at 1024 meters, is about one kilometer north of the station.

See also

Nidareid train disaster

Railway stations in Oppland
Railway stations on the Dovre Line
Railway stations opened in 1921
1921 establishments in Norway